AOR-1 may refer to:

AOR-1, a camouflage pattern used on the U.S. Navy Working Uniform